The Socialist Party without Borders (PSF) is a political party of the opposition in Chad. It is a democratic socialist party with a decentralization- and anti-corruption platform.

On August 6 2021, Yaya Dillo Djerou Betchi was elected president of the party, replacing the founder Dinamou Daram. Under Dinamou Daram, who was jailed by the Chadian government in October 2016, PSF joined the opposition coalition FONAC.

References

2015 establishments in Chad
Democratic socialist parties in Africa
Political parties established in 2015
Political parties in Chad
Socialist parties in Chad